Seva may refer to:

 Seva (Indian religions), volunteer work offered to God (in Indian religions)
 Seva (Puerto Rico), a fictional town described in the novel Seva by Luis López Nieves
 "Seva" (short story), by Puerto Rican author Luis López Nieves
 Seva, Barcelona, a municipality in the comarca of Osona, Catalonia, Spain
 Seva, Ghana, an island in the Volta Region of Ghana
 Seva Canada Society, a Vancouver-based non-profit organization that fights blindness in the developing world
 Seva Foundation, an American non-profit foundation that fights blindness and poverty
 Ševa, a principal character in the Croatian "anti-show" Nightmare Stage
 Seva, a nickname for the East Slavic name Vsevolod
 Stand-up Extravehicular activity, an activity in which an astronaut partially emerges into space

See also
 Seva Sadan (disambiguation)
 Ceva (disambiguation)
 Sevak (disambiguation)